Malcolm MacInnis (born 22 May 1933) is a Canadian educator and politician. MacInnis served as a New Democratic Party member of the House of Commons of Canada.

Born in Halifax, Nova Scotia, MacInnis was first elected at the Cape Breton South riding in the 1962 general election defeating incumbent Donald MacInnis, a Progressive Conservative party member. After serving his only term, the 25th Canadian Parliament, MacInnis was defeated in the 1963 election by Donald MacInnis.

External links
 

1933 births
Living people
Members of the House of Commons of Canada from Nova Scotia
New Democratic Party MPs